The 1992–93 Vanderbilt Commodores men's basketball men's basketball team represented Vanderbilt University as a member of the Southeastern Conference during the 1992–93 college basketball season. The team was led by head coach Eddie Fogler and played its home games at Memorial Gymnasium.

The Commodores won the SEC regular season title, received an at-large bid to the NCAA tournament as No. 3 seed in the West region, and made a run to the Sweet Sixteen. The team finished with a 28–6 record (14–2 SEC, 1st).

Roster

Schedule and results

|-
!colspan=9 style=| Regular season

|-
!colspan=9 style=| SEC tournament

|-
!colspan=9 style=| NCAA tournament

Rankings

Awards and honors
Billy McCaffrey – SEC co-Player of the Year

References

Vanderbilt Commodores men's basketball seasons
Vanderbilt
Vanderbilt Commodores men's basketball
Vanderbilt Commodores men's basketball
Vanderbilt